Derrel Fincher (born June 22, 1958) is an American politician who served in the Oklahoma House of Representatives from the 11th district from 2018 to 2020.

On June 30, 2020, he was defeated in the Republican primary for the 11th district by Wendi Stearman.

References

1958 births
Living people
Republican Party members of the Oklahoma House of Representatives
21st-century American politicians